WBGK (99.7 MHz) and WBUG (101.1 MHz) are commercial FM radio stations simulcasting a country music radio format known as "Bug Country."  WBGK is licensed to Newport Village, New York, and WBUG is licensed to Fort Plain, New York.  They are owned by Roser Communications Network, Inc.  The signals of the two stations cover the Utica-Rome radio market as well as the Mohawk Valley.

Although WBGK is licensed to the village of Newport, New York, the license states "Newport Village" as the city of license. There is no city or village in New York State called "Newport Village".

History
WBUG-FM began as a locally produced simulcast with WBUG in Amsterdam and WBGG in Saratoga Springs. WBGG broke from the simulcast in 1994, and it was replaced with Little Falls-licensed WLFH (now WIXT, a simulcast of variety hits-formatted WKLL-HD2), which had itself been a country music station.

The stations then broadcast the Real Country satellite classic country format from ABC Radio, and added WBGK at 99.7FM in 2001. WLFH was later acquired by Clear Channel Communications and left Bug Country to join the "Sports Stars" network of WADR/WUTQ and WRNY. In 2004, WBUG left Bug Country to become talk-formatted WVTL, leaving WBGK and WBUG-FM as the only two stations in the Bug Country network. In November 2009, WBGK and WBUG-FM dropped Real Country and swapped it with a continuous automated selection of country Christmas music. After the holidays, their current format of mainstream country was launched and the station returned to local production. WBGK had been providing live play-by-play high school football games but that ended in 2011.

On March 30, 2015, Roser Communications moved the studios of all their stations, including WBGK/WBUG-FM, to new facilities located at the Canal Park off Leland Avenue. Prior to this, Roser Communications had been leasing space at the Adirondack Bank building on Genesee Street.

References

External links

BGK
Country radio stations in the United States